Bob Evans Restaurants, also known as Bob Evans, is an American chain of restaurants owned by Golden Gate Capital based in New Albany, Ohio. After its founding in 1948 by Bob Evans (1918–2007), the restaurant chain evolved into a company with the corporate brand name "Bob Evans Farms, Inc." (BEF), and eventually established a separate food division to handle the sale of its products in other markets.

The company made several major acquisitions, including Owens Country Sausage in 1987, and was split in January 2017 with the sale of its restaurant division to an affiliate of Golden Gate Capital. BEF Foods remained independently owned until September 2017 when it was sold to Post Holdings.

The Bob Evans family restaurant chain includes 439 locations in 18 states as of 2023, mostly in the Midwestern and Mid-Atlantic regions of the United States. The locations are all corporate owned, and none of them are franchised.

The restaurants feature a country-living theme, and most locations sell baked goods, snacks, and small gift items. The company formerly offered pork products and refrigerated side dishes in retail grocery and food service markets. The distribution of these products, sold under the Bob Evans and Owens Country Sausage brand names, was independent of the restaurant division.

History

Beginning and consolidation 
Bob Evans Restaurants was founded in 1948 by Bob Evans, when he began processing and packaging sausage for his small diner located in Gallipolis, Ohio. Early operations were based at his farm in Rio Grande. As the reputation of his sausage grew, so did the number of guests who visited his farm to buy it in bulk. Friends and family partnered together to establish Bob Evans Farms, Inc., in 1953. The increased traffic led him to build the first company restaurant at the farm in 1962 that was named "The Sausage Shop".

After encountering a capacity problem fulfilling large orders, Bob Evans contracted with his cousin Tim Evans of the Evans Packing Company to package Bob Evans Sausage products. Another relative, Dan Evans, served as CEO until his retirement in 2000.

The company acquired Texas-based Owens Country Sausage in 1987. Owing to trademark issues, the company branded its otherwise identical restaurants in Texas as Owens Restaurants. By January 2006, all Owens restaurants had been closed.

The company operated a Mexican-themed restaurant called Cantina del Rio in the mid-1990s, a move that founder Bob Evans called "a disaster" in 2003.

The Evans family controlled daily operations of the company until 2000, when Dan Evans retired as CEO. After this, Stewart K. Owens (a former officer of the Owens Country Sausage company and later president of BOBE) assumed control of Bob Evans Farms Inc. as CEO. In 2001, he became chairman of the board. Company profits faltered under Owens' tenure. In August 2005, after corporate profits had dropped in eight of the previous nine quarters, Owens announced his resignation. After operating for several months under interim CEO Larry Corbin, the company hired Steven Davis, former president of Long John Silver's, as CEO in May 2006.

In July 2004, Bob Evans Farms purchased the California-based Mimi's Cafe restaurant chain (operating under SWH Corporation) for $182 million. Mimi's Cafe had 144 locations throughout the U.S. at the time. They featured casual dining and American food with a French emphasis and decorative elements. Bob Evans Farms sold Mimi's Cafe to the U.S. branch of Groupe Le Duff in 2013.

In an effort to update the company's image, Bob Evans debuted a new prototype design at their restaurant location in Xenia, Ohio, on August 17, 2009. The new look included flat-screen televisions, free Wi-Fi, curbside carryout services, and redesigned uniforms for staff. Its architecture and interior design drew inspiration from the Bob Evans family farm in southern Ohio in a way that the company called a "contemporary and relevant twist".

CEO Steven Davis resigned in December 2014.

In December 2015, the chain announced its intention to sell 145 properties to Mesirow Financial Holdings Inc. for  $165–175 million.

Separation from and dissolution of Bob Evans Farms 
On January 24, 2017, Bob Evans Farms announced the sale of its restaurants business unit to the private equity company Golden Gate Capital (owners of Red Lobster and California Pizza Kitchen) for US$565 million plus the assumption of up to US$50 million in liabilities. In addition to the restaurants, Golden Gate Capital also took ownership of the Bob Evans Farm in Bidwell, Ohio, near Rio Grande. Once the sale was finalized, Bob Evans Farms CEO Saed Mohseni moved to Golden Gate Capital to serve as president of the Bob Evans restaurant division. BFF Foods President Mike Townsley became president and CEO of the new Bob Evans Farms, which remains a public company focusing on grocery products such as breakfast sausage and refrigerated side dishes. Net proceeds from the sale to Bob Evans Farms was expected to be between $475 million and $485 million.

On the same day, Bob Evans Farms entered into an agreement to acquire the Pineland Farms Potato Co. of Mars Hill, Maine, for US$115 million. Pineland Farms is a value-added potato processor, including a  potato farm, serving the retail and food service markets. They also operate a cheese-processing business. Both the sale of the restaurant division to Golden Gate Capital and the purchase of Pineland Farms Potato Company closed on March 1, 2017.

On September 19, 2017, Bob Evans Farms announced that it would be acquired by Post Holdings. Post Holdings also announced that upon completion of the acquisition, they would combine their existing Michael Foods refrigerated retail business with that of Bob Evans Farms. This unit would initially operate under the Bob Evans Farms name (before eventually being changed to Post Refrigerated Retail) and would be led by the then-current Bob Evans Farms president and CEO, Mike Townsley. Bob Evans Farms foodservice business would be moved to Michael Foods, and led by division president Jim Dwyer. The sale of Bob Evans Farms to Post Holdings closed on January 12, 2018, when Bob Evans Farms stock was delisted from the NASDAQ Global Select Market, and the company ceased to exist as an independent organization.

See also
 List of casual dining restaurant chains
 List of restaurant chains in the United States

References

External links

 Official website (archived, 24 Apr 2018)
 Bob Evans Farms, Inc. SEC Filings

Restaurants established in 1948
1948 establishments in Ohio
Companies based in the Columbus, Ohio metropolitan area
Companies formerly listed on the Nasdaq
Restaurants in Ohio
Restaurant chains in the United States
Fast-food chains of the United States
Theme restaurants
2017 mergers and acquisitions
Private equity portfolio companies